In geometry, Bretschneider's formula is the following expression for the area of a general quadrilateral:

Bretschneider's formula works on both convex and concave quadrilaterals (but not crossed ones), whether it is cyclic or not.

The German mathematician Carl Anton Bretschneider discovered the formula in 1842. The formula was also derived in the same year by the German mathematician Karl Georg Christian von Staudt.

Proof 
Then we have

Therefore

The law of cosines implies that

because both sides equal the square of the length of the diagonal . This can be rewritten as

Adding this to the above formula for  yields

Note that:  (a trigonometric identity true for all )

Following the same steps as in Brahmagupta's formula, this can be written as

Introducing the semiperimeter
 
the above becomes

and Bretschneider's formula follows after taking the square root of both sides:

The second form is given by using the cosine half-angle identity

yielding

Emmanuel García has used the generalized half angle formulas to give an alternative proof.

Related formulae 
Bretschneider's formula generalizes Brahmagupta's formula for the area of a cyclic quadrilateral, which in turn generalizes Heron's formula for the area of a triangle.

Notes

References & further reading 
 
 C. A. Bretschneider.  Untersuchung der trigonometrischen Relationen des geradlinigen Viereckes. Archiv der Mathematik und Physik, Band 2, 1842, S. 225-261 ( online copy, German)
 F. Strehlke: Zwei neue Sätze vom ebenen und sphärischen Viereck und Umkehrung des Ptolemaischen Lehrsatzes. Archiv der Mathematik und Physik, Band 2, 1842, S. 323-326 (online copy, German)

External links 
 
Bretschneider's formula at proofwiki.org

Theorems about quadrilaterals
Area
Articles containing proofs